Live at FM 101 is the debut live album and overall the third album by the Pakistani progressive rock band, Mizraab, released in June 2009. It is exclusively a digital download live album, and has not been released on a physical medium. The album included recordings from the band's live performances during a radio interview on FM 101. This was Mizraab's debut performance at any radio station. The album was recorded and produced by Sharaf Qaisar.

Track listing
All music written, composed & arranged by Mizraab.

Personnel
All information is taken from the CD.

Mizraab
Faraz Anwar - lead vocals, lead guitar
Irfan Ahmad - drums
Jamal Mustafa - rhythm guitar
Faraz Arshad - bass, backing vocals

Production
Produced by Faraz Anwar, Sharaf Qaisar
Recorded by Sharaf Qaisar
Recorded & Mixed at FM 101 Studios in Karachi, Pakistan

References

External links
Official Website
Myspace Page

2009 live albums
Mizraab albums
Urdu-language albums